A gorytos is a type of leather bow-case for a short composite bow used by the Scythians in classical antiquity.  They are a combination of bow case and quiver in one, and are worn on the archer's left hip with the opening tilted rearward.  Many gorytos were highly decorated, and at least one surviving specimen was determined via SEM examination to be made of human skin.

Some have been found in Macedonian tombs, such as the so-called "Tomb of Philip" in Vergina of the 2nd half of the 4th century BCE. They were also used by the Persians. Indo-Greeks adopted the composite bow and the gorytos as part of their mounted archery equipment from around 100 BCE, as can be seen on their coins.

External links

References

History of archery
Ancient Greek military equipment
Ancient Greek military terminology